Springhill is a census-designated place (CDP) in Gallatin County, Montana, United States. The population was 130 at the 2010 census. It is 14 miles north of Bozeman.

Demographics

See also
 List of census-designated places in Montana

References

External links

Census-designated places in Gallatin County, Montana
Census-designated places in Montana